Arden Priory was a priory near to Hawnby in the Ryedale district of North Yorkshire, England. A Benedictine nunnery has been recorded here since 1150 and at the time of its dissolution in 1536 it had 6 nuns, one Prioress and an elderly sister. They were aided by sixteen servants.

References

Monasteries in North Yorkshire